Hellinsia bigoti is a moth of the family Pterophoridae. It is known from Ethiopia.

References

Endemic fauna of Ethiopia
bigoti
Moths of Africa
Insects of Ethiopia
Moths described in 1983